The Bendix AN/FPS-30 was a long-range search radar deployed at Distant Early Warning Line (DEW Line) sites in Greenland.  It was an advancement over the AN/FPS-19 radars deployed in Alaska and Canada, being optimized for use in severe Arctic conditions.    It was planned as a replacement, however cost constraints led to it only being installed at the Greenland DYE sites.

References

  USAF Air Defense Radar Equipment

External links

Ground radars
Military equipment introduced in the 1950s